Dyersville was a mining town — now a ghost town — in Summit County, Colorado, United States.  It was named after Methodist minister John Lewis Dyer.  Nothing remains of the town except the roofless walls of a couple of log cabins.

History
Methodist minister and prospector John Lewis Dyer, better known as "Father" Dyer, built a cabin in a secluded location along the upper reaches of Indiana Creek in January 1881.  He was soon joined in his seclusion by miners and merchants connected to the nearby Warrior's Mark mine.  The community named itself after its first resident, Father Dyer.

Notable residents
 John Lewis Dyer, pioneer Methodist minister.

Geography

See also
List of ghost towns in Colorado

References

External links
 Rocky Mountain Profiles:  Dyersville Colorado Townsite - Ghost town
 Ghosttowns.com:  Dyersville

Ghost towns in Colorado
Former populated places in Summit County, Colorado